That Darn Cat! is a 1965 American thriller comedy film directed by Robert Stevenson and starring Hayley Mills and Dean Jones in a story about bank robbers, a kidnapping and a mischievous cat; produced by Walt Disney Productions. The film was based on the 1963 novel Undercover Cat by Gordon and Mildred Gordon. The title song was written by the Sherman Brothers and sung by Bobby Darin. The 1997 remake includes a cameo appearance by Dean Jones.

That Darn Cat! was both Hayley Mills' last film of the six she appeared in for the Walt Disney Studios, and Dean Jones' first film for Disney. Mills later said it was a mistake to leave Disney.

Plot
"Darn Cat" or "DC" is a wily, adventurous Siamese tomcat who lives with young suburbanite sisters Ingrid "Inky" and Patricia "Patti" Randall and enjoys an evening route wandering thru town which includes teasing local dogs, swiping food, and marking vehicles with muddy paws.

One night, DC follows bank robber Iggy into an apartment where he and his partner Dan are holding bank employee Miss Margaret Miller hostage. Miss Miller uses the opportunity to replace his collar with her watch, on which she has inscribed most of the word "HELP," and releases him to go home to the Randalls.

Patti discovers the watch on DC and suspects that it belongs to the kidnapped woman. She goes to the FBI and tells Agent Zeke Kelso of her discovery, and Supervisor Newton assigns Kelso to follow DC in the hope that he will lead them back to the robbers' hideout.

Kelso sets up a headquarters in the Randalls' house and assigns a team to keep the cat under surveillance, but, despite multiple attempts and a bugging system, DC eludes them in humiliating and comedic ways, culminating in a chase where he leads Agent Kelso through several back yards and a drive-in theatre. As DC ends up trying to open a pigeon cage and is discovered by the owner Gregory Benson, who is in Ingrid's carpool, chases DC and Kelso and, out of frustration, tells Ingrid he is leaving her carpool. The next day agent Kelso's supervisor Newton shuts down the operation, considering the evidence of the watch not hard enough, but Patti disguises herself as the hippie niece of her friend Mr. Hoffsteddar the jeweler and persuades the FBI that the watch was indeed hard evidence. Patti and Kelso rescue Miss Miller and bring the robbers to justice.

Subplots involve a romance between Patti's sister Ingrid and Kelso as he joins her new carpool, and a romance between Patti herself and a surf-obsessed slacker neighbor, Canoe Henderson, and the meddling of nosy neighbor Mrs. MacDougall and her disapproving husband, Wilmer MacDougall. At the end, it is revealed that a gray cat in the opening sequence and DC are taking their kittens on the prowl, having started a family.

Cast

 Syn Cat the Siamese cat as D.C. (Darn Cat)
 Hayley Mills as Patricia "Patti" Randall
 Dean Jones as FBI Agent Zeke Kelso
 Dorothy Provine as Ingrid Randall
 Roddy McDowall as Gregory Benson
 Neville Brand as Dan
 Frank Gorshin as Iggy
 Elsa Lanchester as Mrs. MacDougall
 William Demarest as Mr. Wilmer MacDougall
 Tom Lowell as Canoe Henderson
 Ed Wynn as Mr. Hofstedder the Jeweller
 Richard Eastham as FBI Supervisor Mr. Newton
 Liam Sullivan as Agent Graham
 Grayson Hall as Ms. Margaret Miller
 Iris Adrian as Mrs. Tabin the Landlady
 Richard Deacon as the drive-in theater manager
 Ben Lessy as Burton the drive-in concessionaire
 Don Dorrell as Spires
 Gene Blakely as Cahill
 Karl Held as Kelly

Production
The exterior neighborhood scenes were filmed on The Walt Disney Studios backlot in Burbank, California.

Each of the Seal Point Siamese cats who collectively play the role of DC is a so-called "traditional" or "old style" Siamese, as opposed to the more dainty, long and tubular modern Siamese show cat.  One of the cats used for the film belonged to longtime cat breeder Edith Williams, a member of the Stud Book Fanciers Association. One of the feline actors also starred, along with two dogs, in Disney's 1963 film The Incredible Journey.

Reception

Bosley Crowther of The New York Times wrote: "The feline that plays the informant, as the F.B.I. puts it, is superb. Clark Gable at the peak of his performing never played a tom cat more winningly. This elegant, blue-eyed creature is a paragon of suavity and grace", and concluded, "it's an entertaining picture. Even a king might profitably look at That Darn Cat". Variety said: "Walt Disney comes up with a novelty charmer in this lilting translation of the Gordon's [sic] whimsical tale of a Siamese cat who helps the FBI solve a kidnapping case". Philip K. Scheuer of the Los Angeles Times stated: "As a detective story, That Darn Cat! is strictly for juveniles and the juvenile-minded. It contains little of the step-by-step development which in good detective stories brings out the sleuthing in all of us, being content to settle for a series of gags in which that darn cat, a brownish Siamese, leads the FBI and others on a number of false scents till he and we finally barge in on the criminals". Richard L. Coe of The Washington Post declared: "That Darn Cat is a dandy Christmas present for everyone except the Scrooges. Children will enjoy its pranks, adults its whimsy, cat-lovers its Siamese and even J. Edgar Hoover won't mind this use of the FBI". Brendan Gill of The New Yorker called the film "a typical product of the giant Disney flapdoodle factory, which for many years now has devoted itself to grinding out lavish falsifications of contemporary life".

In September 1965, Hedda Hopper reported Disney had commissioned a sequel from the Gordons enritled Undercover Cat Prowls Again but it was not made.

The film holds a 94% rating on Rotten Tomatoes based on 16 reviews.

Awards and nominations
The film's writers, Mildred Gordon, Gordon Gordon, and Bill Walsh, were nominated by the Writers Guild of America for Best Written American Comedy.  The film was also nominated for an Edgar Allan Poe Award for Best Motion Picture, and a Golden Leaf nomination for Best Supporting Actress (Elsa Lanchester).  Mills won the 1966 second place Golden Leaf award for Comedy Performance, Actress. The Sherman Brothers won the third place Golden Leaf award for Best Song.

Comic book adaptation
 Gold Key: That Darn Cat (February 1966)

See also
 List of American films of 1965

References

External links
 
 
 
 That Darn Cat! DVD release review
 ''1965 cross promotions for 'That Darn Cat!'
 The film's profile in the Numbers

1965 films
1960s buddy comedy films
1960s children's comedy films
1960s comedy mystery films
1960s comedy thriller films
American buddy comedy films
American children's comedy films
American comedy mystery films
1960s English-language films
Films about the Federal Bureau of Investigation
Films about kidnapping
Films about animals
Films about bank robbery
Films about cats
Films about missing people
Films adapted into comics
Films based on American novels
Films based on children's books
Films based on mystery novels
Films directed by Robert Stevenson
Films produced by Walt Disney
Films produced by Bill Walsh (producer)
Films shot in California
Hippie films
Films with screenplays by the Gordons
Walt Disney Pictures films
1965 comedy films
1960s American films